Swat the Crook is a 1919 American short comedy film featuring Harold Lloyd. A print of the film exists.

Cast
 Harold Lloyd as Harold
 Snub Pollard
 Bebe Daniels
 Sammy Brooks
 Billy Fay
 Lew Harvey
 Dee Lampton
 Gus Leonard
 Marie Mosquini
 Fred C. Newmeyer
 James Parrott
 Dorothea Wolbert
 Noah Young

See also
 Harold Lloyd filmography

References

External links

1919 films
American silent short films
1919 comedy films
American black-and-white films
Films directed by Hal Roach
1919 short films
Silent American comedy films
American comedy short films
1910s American films